Duangjai Taewaprom is Thai lakorn which is under process of filming. It is the sequel of Suphapburut Juthathep series, airing in 2013. The series was based on the novel of the same name and written by the same writers as its preceding story. Duangjai Taewaprom consists of Laorchan, Kwanruetai, Jaiphisut, Dujapsorn and Porncheewan.

History 
In 2015, the publisher and the writers of its novels announced to write a sequel to Suphapburut Juthathep, due to the overwhelming success of its TV series in 2013. The writers would write the sequel of their preceding stories — Nara writes Dujapsorn, Romkaew writes Porncheewan, Gaotam writes Kwanruetai, Sornklin writes Laorchan and Praenut writes Jaiphisut. The story is mainly about the life of Taewaprom's heirs, so the titles of the novels use the female lead characters' names.

In 2020, Channel 3 confirmed that Duangjai Taewaprom was in the process of being made into a television series and was using the same titles as the novels. Also, it would be produced by the same companies and the same directors as Suphapburut Juthathep. Later, it was reported that the series had cast the main roles. At the time, it was predicted that the new cast would portray the main characters, but it did not have any confirmation from either Channel 3 or the production team.

Until 2022, Channel 3 held the official opening event of the series, "Duangjai Taewaprom Debut Night", at River Park, Iconsiam on March 23. The event was held for both the celebration of Channel 3's 52nd anniversary and the revealing of the series' main cast.

Family trees

Taewaprom family 

Reference :

Juthathep family 

Reference :

M.R. Taratorn, M.R. Pawornruj, M.R. Puttipat, M.R. Rachanon and M.R. Ronapee are considered as the 3rd generation of Juthathep family and they are called as 5 Sighs of Juthathep. So in the 4th generation, the first child of the 3rd generation all are males, they are called as Second Generation of 5 Sigh of Juthathep.

Laorchan 
Laorchan is the first drama of the series, based on a novel series of the same name. Its novel is wrote by Sornklin and is the sequel of Khun Chai Rachanon. The drama is produced by  The producer and director is Aeknaree Wachirabunjong and Pongpat Wachirabunjong, respectively.

Plot 
Laorchan, a girl who conceals her true identity to apply for work as a secretary of M.L. Phuthanate Juthathep at JT Center, the department store which belongs to Juthathep family. She intends to steal Atchanajakkra, the mysterious sapphire necklace of Bhukhamwong royal, for the sake of proving the innocence of her family.

A necklace full of dark mysteries becomes a noose that ties the hearts of both of them together. They have to cooperate with each other to find the truth of the mystery and overcome the danger that could shake the throne of Viangbhukham. Moreover, the both are finding their true feelings with the help of the people around.

Cast

Main 
  as Laorchan Pantaewa / Chao Laorchan Bhukhamwong
A princess of Bhukhamwong royal family in Viangbhukham. She came to Thailand to steal the Atchanajakkra necklace that can prove the innocence of her family, which will be displayed at the JT Center department store. After solving the problem about her family, she later finds out the fact that she is a part of the Taewaprom family.

 Kanawut Traipipattanapong as M.L. Phuthanate Juthathep / Khun Phu
The eldest son of M.R. Rachanon and Soifah Juthathep Na Ayutthaya and he has a sister named M.L. Kanthika. He is the Managing director and CEO of JT Development and JT Center – the department store that is under JT Development. He is a perfectionist and being good at management; therefore, he is ordered to prepare an exhibition of the Atchanajakkra necklace.

Supporting 
  as Maj., M.L. Asira Juthathep / Khun Petch
The oldest son of M.R. Taratorn and M.L. Raweeramphai Juthathep, the oldest among the 4th generation of the family and the older brother of M.L. Anistha Juthathep. He is calm and brave as the military special force.

 Noppakao Dechaphatthanakun as M.L. Saruj Juthathep / Khun Saruj
The second of Juthathap 4th generation and the only son of M.R. Pawornruj and Rasa Juthathep Na Ayutthaya. Now, he is the second secretary of the Embassy of Thailand in Washington, D.C., United States. He is calm and loves to serve for his siblings as a father.

 Mike Panithan as Maj., M.D., M.L. Chatklao Juthathep / Khun Chat
The only son of M.R. Puttipat and Krongkaew and the brother of M.L. Pokkate. He is an Orthopedic surgeon who graduated from Phramongkutklao College of Medicine, the first and only medical cadet school in Thailand. After graduation, he chose to work at the fort hospital near the country border in Chiang Rai province.

 Tate Myron as Capt., M.L. Ronnajak Juthathep / Khun Jak
The oldest son of M.R. Ronapee and Piangkwan, the eldest among four siblings. He is a Cavalry soldier who works as the troop commander at 29th Cavalry Squadron King's Royal Guard. He is elegant, as used to be a model, and hilarious like his father.

 Suppapong Udomkaewkanjana as Plt. Off., M.L. Ronnaphoom Juthathep / Khun Phoom
The second son of M.R. Ronapee and Piangkwan, the younger brother of M.L. Ronnajak. He is the Royal Thai Air Force fighter pilot of F-16 in the 1st Airborne, Nakhon Ratchasima. He is a playful person as same as his brother and father and has the special sense of the future event.

  as Oon / Khun Tuad Oon
The younger sister of Mom Aiet, the grandmother of 5 M.R.s and the great-grandmother of the M.L.s. Currently, she is in her 90s.

 Sinjai Plengpanich as Piangkwan Juthathep Na Ayutthaya
The wife of M.R. Ronapee and the mother of M.L. Ronnajak, M.L. Ronnaphoom, M.L. Ronnaret and M.L. Ronnakorn. She is still a legend in the film industry.

Kwanruetai 
Kwanruetai is the second drama of the series, based on a novel series of the same name. Its novel is wrote by Gaotam who also wrote their parents' story, Khun Chai Puttipat.

Plot 
Maj., M.D., M.L. Chatklao Juthathep, a smart military doctor who works far in Chiang Rai province, meets Kwanruetai, the young food vendor who is brave and tough. Chatklao's polite and gentle personality makes the girl misunderstands that he is gay. The both always argue and fight with each other, but suddenly there is a reason that they turn to cooperate together for helping to break down drug production sites.

They have a good feeling for one another but the past of their parents separate them apart. Their paths seemed to be parallel, only the power of true love can lead them listen to the voice of their hearts.

Cast

Main 
  as Kwanruetai Taewaprom / Tai
A courageous, tough and bright girl who lives in Chiang Rai. She has a stepbrother and stepfather who she thought they are her real family. Actually, she is the daughter of M.L. Marathee Taewaprom and Sir Pinij.

 Mike Panithan as Maj., M.D., M.L. Chatklao Juthathep / Khun Chat
The only son of M.R. Puttipat and Krongkaew and the brother of M.L. Pokkate. He is an Orthopedic surgeon who graduated from Phramongkutklao College of Medicine, the first and only medical cadet school in Thailand. After graduation, he chose to work at the fort hospital near the country border in Chiang Rai province.

Supporting 
  as Maj., M.L. Asira Juthathep / Khun Petch
The oldest son of M.R. Taratorn and M.L. Raweeramphai Juthathep, the oldest among the 4th generation of the family and the older brother of M.L. Anistha Juthathep. He is calm and brave as being the military special force.

 Noppakao Dechaphatthanakun as M.L. Saruj Juthathep / Khun Saruj
The second of Juthathap 4th generation and the only son of M.R. Pawornruj and Rasa Juthathep Na Ayutthaya. Now, he is the second secretary of the Embassy of Thailand in Washington, D.C., United States. He is calm and loves to serve the siblings as his father.

 Kanawut Traipipattanapong as M.L. Phuthanate Juthathep / Khun Phu
The eldest son of M.R. Rachanon and Soifah Juthathep Na Ayutthaya and he has a sister named is M.L. Kanthika. He is the Managing director and CEO of JT Development and JT Center – the department store that is under JT Development. He is a perfectionist and good at management.

 Tate Myron as Capt., M.L. Ronnajak Juthathep / Khun Jak
The oldest son of M.R. Ronapee and Piangkwan, the eldest among four siblings. He is a Cavalry soldier who works as the troop commander at 29th Cavalry Squadron King's Royal Guard. He is elegant, as used to be a model, and a hilarious person like his father.

 Suppapong Udomkaewkanjana as Plt. Off., M.L. Ronnaphoom Juthathep / Khun Phoom
The second son of M.R. Ronapee and Piangkwan, the younger brother of M.L. Ronnajak. He is the Royal Thai Air Force fighter pilot of F-16 in the 1st Airborne, Nakhon Ratchasima. He is a playful person as same as his brother and father and has the special sense of the future event.

  as Oon / Khun Tuad Oon
The younger sister of Mom Aiet, the grandmother of 5 M.R.s and the great-grandmother of the M.L.s. Currently, she is in her 90s.

Jaiphisut 
Jaiphisut is the third drama of the series, based on a novel series of the same name. Its novel is wrote by Praenut and is the sequel of Khun Chai Ronapee. The drama is produced by Metta and Mahaniyom Co., Ltd. Chatchai Plengpanich is both producer and director.

Plot 
Suddenly, Capt. M.L. Roonajak Juthathep has to adopt Somjeed, the naughty sister of his best friend. The only one who can help him is 'Mhoo Pook', the crying girl that he usually teased in the past. The girl become Kru Jaiphisut, the class teacher of Somjeed, who had the most beautiful legs he had ever seen.

Even though she has the suspicion origin which may detrimental to the Juthathep family, but he does not afraid and also looking for ways to win the heart of her to make his first love become eternal love.

Cast

Main 
  as Jaiphisut / Nhoo Pook / Kru Jaiphisut / Mhoo Pook (childhood)
The teacher at the element school were Somjeed and Plawarn attended. She is a kind and grateful teacher; therefore, she is the students' favorite. Jaiphisut used to play with M.L. Ronnajak and M.L. Phuthanet in the childhood. She was chubby back then, so when they meet again, they can not recognize her. She later finds out that herself inheriting Taewaprom's blood.

 Tate Myron as Capt., M.L. Ronnajak Juthathep / Khun Jak
The oldest son of M.R. Ronapee and Piangkwan, the eldest among four siblings. He is a Cavalry soldier who works as the troop commander at 29th Cavalry Squadron King's Royal Guard. He is elegant, as used to be a model, and a hilarious person like his father.

Supporting 
  as Maj., M.L. Asira Juthathep / Khun Petch
The oldest son of M.R. Taratorn and M.L. Raweeramphai Juthathep, the oldest among the 4th generation of the family and the older brother of M.L. Anistha Juthathep. He is calm and brave as being the military special force.

 Noppakao Dechaphatthanakun as M.L. Saruj Juthathep / Khun Saruj
The second of Juthathap 4th generation and the only son of M.R. Pawornruj and Rasa Juthathep Na Ayutthaya. Now, he is the second secretary of the Embassy of Thailand in Washington, D.C., United States. He is calm and loves to serve the siblings as his father.

 Mike Panithan as Maj., M.D., M.L. Chatklao Juthathep / Khun Chat
The only son of M.R. Puttipat and Krongkaew and the brother of M.L. Pokkate. He is an Orthopedic surgeon who graduated from Phramongkutklao College of Medicine, the first and only medical cadet school in Thailand. After graduation, he chose to work at the fort hospital near the country border in Chiang Rai province.

  as Kwanruetai Juthathep Na Ayutthaya / Tai
The brave and naughty girl who is the wife of M.L. Chatklao. Actually, she is the daughter of M.L. Marathee Taewaprom and Sir Pinij. She graduated nursing course before marriage and currently works as a nurse.

 Kanawut Traipipattanapong as M.L. Phuthanate Juthathep / Khun Phu
The eldest son of M.R. Rachanon and Soifah Juthathep Na Ayutthaya and he has a sister named is M.L. Kanthika. He is the Managing director and CEO of JT Development and JT Center – the department store that is under JT Development. He is a perfectionist and good at management.

  as Laorchan Juthathep Na Ayutthaya / Chao Laorchan
M.L. Phuthanet's wife and the grest-granddaughter of M.C. Jakkrarin Taewaprom

 Suppapong Udomkaewkanjana as Plt. Off., M.L. Ronnaphoom Juthathep / Khun Phoom
The second son of M.R. Ronapee and Piangkwan, the younger brother of M.L. Ronnajak. He is the Royal Thai Air Force fighter pilot of F-16 in the 1st Airborne, Nakhon Ratchasima. He is a playful person as same as his brother and father and has the special sense of the future event.

  as Oon / Khun Tuad Oon
The younger sister of Mom Aiet, the grandmother of 5 M.R.s and the great-grandmother of the M.L.s. Currently, she is in her 90s.

 Sinjai Plengpanich as Piangkwan Juthathep Na Ayutthaya
The wife of M.R. Ronapee and the mother of M.L. Ronnajak, M.L. Ronnaphoom, M.L. Ronnaret and M.L. Ronnakorn. She is still being the legend in the film industry.

Dujapsorn 
Dujapsorn is the forth drama of the series, based on a novel series of the same name. Its novel is wrote by Nara and is the sequel of Khun Chai Taratorn.

Plot 
Dujapsorn determines to take revenge on behalf of her mother, M.L. Wilairampa Taewaprom, she therefore applies for a job at JT Property Group Pub Co., Ltd., finding the way closer to M.R. Ronapee's offsprings. As the time passes, she falls in love with M.L. Asira Juthathep, but he is not the right one that her mother wanted.

On the other hand, M.L. Asira used to meet her once in the past and he has waited to meet her again. Eventually, he meets her again but the love of the couple had her mother's hatred as a barrier. However, it doesn't matter, because the destiny has determined the love already.

Cast

Main 
  as Dujapsorn Taewaprom / Fah
The daughter of M.L. Wilairampha, the former fiancée of M.R. Ronpaee. She conceals her true identity and applies for work as the secretary of M.L. Asira, for taking the revenge to M.R. Ronapee's heirs following the order of the mother.

  as Maj., M.L. Asira Juthathep / Khun Petch
The oldest son of M.R. Taratorn and M.L. Raweerampai Juthathep, the oldest among the 4th generation of the family and being the older brother of M.L. Anittha Juthathep. He is calm and bold as the eldest. He used to serve as the military in the special unit but later quitted for becoming CEO of JT Property Group Pub Co., Ltd. after his father's retirement.

Supporting 
 Noppakao Dechaphatthanakun as M.L. Saruj Juthathep / Khun Saruj
The second of Juthathap 4th generation and the only son of M.R. Pawornruj and Rasa Juthathep Na Ayutthaya. Now, he is the second secretary of the Embassy of Thailand in Washington, D.C., United States. He is calm and loves to serve his siblings, like his father.

 Mike Panithan as Maj., M.D., M.L. Chatklao Juthathep / Khun Chat
The only son of M.R. Puttipat and Krongkaew and the brother of M.L. Pokkate. He is an Orthopedic surgeon graduated from Phramongkutklao College of Medicine, the first and only medical cadet school in Thailand. After graduation, he chose to work at the fort hospital near the country border in Chiang Rai province.

  as Kwanruetai Juthathep Na Ayutthaya / Tai
The courageous and naughty girl who is the wife of M.L. Chatklao. In fact, she is the daughter of M.L. Marathee Taewaprom and Sir Pinij. She graduated nursing course before marriage and currently works as a nurse.

 Kanawut Traipipattanapong as M.L. Phuthanate Juthathep / Khun Phu
The eldest son of M.R. Rachanon and Soifah Juthathep Na Ayutthaya and he has a sister named is M.L. Kanthika. He is the Managing director and CEO of JT Development and JT Center, the department store that is under JT Development. He is a perfectionist and good at management.

  as Laorchan Juthathep Na Ayutthaya / Chao Laorchan
M.L. Phuthanet's wife and a descendant of Taewaprom family.

 Tate Myron as Capt., M.L. Ronnajak Juthathep / Khun Jak
The oldest son of M.R. Ronapee and Piangkwan, the eldest among 4 siblings. He is a Cavalry soldier who works as the troop commander at 29th Cavalry Squadron King's Royal Guard. He is elegant, as used to be the model, and hilarious person as same as his father.

  as Jaiphisut Juthathep Na Ayutthaya / Nhoo Pook
She is the wife of M.L. Ronnajak and the teacher at the elementary school. She also inherited Taewaprom's blood.

 Suppapong Udomkaewkanjana as Flg. Off., M.L. Ronnaphoom Juthathep / Khun Phoom
The second son of M.R. Ronapee and Piangkwan, the younger brother of M.L. Ronnajak. He is the Royal Thai Air Force fighter pilot of F-16 in the 1st Airborne, Nakhon Ratchasima. He is a playful person as same as his brother and father and has the special sense of the future event.

  as Oon / Khun Tuad Oon
The younger sister of Mom Aiet, the grandmother of 5 M.R.s and the great-grandmother of the M.L.s. Currently, she is in her 90s.

 Sinjai Plengpanich as Piangkwan Juthathep Na Ayutthaya
The wife of M.R. Ronapee and the mother of M.L. Ronnajak, M.L. Ronnaphoom, M.L. Ronnaret and M.L. Ronnakorn. She is still being the legend in the film industry.

Porncheewan 
Porncheewan is the forth drama of the series, based on a novel series of the same name. Its novel is wrote by Romkaew and is the sequel of Khun Chai Pawornruj. The drama is produced by GOOD Feeling Co., Ltd.  is both producer and director. Moreover, the drama is filmed in Switzerland.

Plot 
The optimistic daughter of M.L. Kratin Taewaprom, Cheewan who received a scholarship from Oon to study in Italy. She takes the order from Oon to be the cupid connecting a relationship between M.L. Saruj Juthathep and Porncheewa, the youngest daughter of M.L. Kedsara Taewaprom. The mission is challenging since the both are arrogant, cold and also undemonstrative.

The story would go well, if the profound charm of the secretary is not get into the eyes' of the cupid, which causing she falls in the love with him.

Cast

Main 
  as Cheewan Wongnakorn
The only daughter of M.L. Kratin Taewaprom. She is close to Porncheewa because they are of the same age and played together since young. She received the scholarship from Oon to study in Italy at the same time as Porncheewa. She is a bright, brave, patient and grateful person.

 Noppakao Dechaphatthanakun as M.L. Saruj Juthathep / Khun Saruj
The second of Juthathap 4th generation and the only son of M.R. Pawornruj and Rasa Juthathep Na Ayutthaya. Now, he is the first secretary of the Embassy of Thailand in Rome, Italy. He is calm, arrogant, cold and loves to serve for his siblings like his father.

Supporting 
  as Maj., M.L. Asira Juthathep / Khun Petch
The oldest son of M.R. Taratorn and M.L. Raweerampai Juthathep, the oldest among the 4th generation of the family and being the older brother of M.L. Anittha Juthathep. He is calm and brave as the eldest. He used to serve as the military in the special unit but later quitted for becoming CEO of JT Property Group Pub Co., Ltd. after his father's retirement.

  as Dujapsorn Juthathep Na Ayutthaya / Fah
The daughter of M.L. Wilairampha and the wife of M.L. Asira Juthathep

 Mike Panithan as Maj., M.D., M.L. Chatklao Juthathep / Khun Chat
The only son of M.R. Puttipat and Krongkaew and the brother of M.L. Pokkate. He is an Orthopedic surgeon graduated from Phramongkutklao College of Medicine, the first and only medical cadet school in Thailand. After graduation, he chose to work at the fort hospital near the country border in Chiang Rai province.

  as Kwanruetai Juthathep Na Ayutthaya / Tai
The courageous and naughty girl who is the wife of M.L. Chatklao. Actually, she is the daughter of M.L. Marathee Taewaprom and Sir Pinij. She graduated nursing course before marriage and currently works as a nurse.

 Kanawut Traipipattanapong as M.L. Phuthanate Juthathep / Khun Phu
The eldest son of M.R. Rachanon and Soifah Juthathep Na Ayutthaya and he has a sister named is M.L. Kanthika. He is the Managing director and CEO of JT Development and JT Center, the department store that is under JT Development. He is a perfectionist and good at management.

  as Laorchan Juthathep Na Ayutthaya / Chao Laorchan
M.L. Phuthanet's wife and a descendant of Taewaprom family.

 Tate Myron as Capt., M.L. Ronnajak Juthathep / Khun Jak
The oldest son of M.R. Ronapee and Piangkwan, the eldest among 4 siblings. He is a Cavalry soldier who works as the troop commander at 29th Cavalry Squadron King's Royal Guard. He is elegant, as used to be the model, and hilarious person as same as his father.

  as Jaiphisut Juthathep Na Ayutthaya / Nhoo Pook
She is the wife of M.L. Ronnajak and the teacher at the elementary school. She also inherited Taewaprom's blood.

 Suppapong Udomkaewkanjana as Flg. Off., M.L. Ronnaphoom Juthathep / Khun Phoom
The second son of M.R. Ronapee and Piangkwan, the younger brother of M.L. Ronnajak. He is the Royal Thai Air Force fighter pilot of F-16 in the 1st Airborne, Nakhon Ratchasima. He is a funny person as same as his brother and father and has the special sense of the future event.

  as Oon / Khun Tuad Oon
The younger sister of Mom Aiet, the grandmother of 5 M.R.s and the great-grandmother of the M.L.s. Currently, she is in her 90s.

 Sinjai Plengpanich as Piangkwan Juthathep Na Ayutthaya
The wife of M.R. Ronapee and the mother of M.L. Ronnajak, M.L. Ronnaphoom, M.L. Ronnaret and M.L. Ronnakorn. She is still being the legend in the film industry.

Anecdotes 

 JT Development is the company established by M.R. Rachanon Juthathep, having other Juthathep members as the shareholders and M.L. Phuthanate as the CEO.
 JT Center is the department store that managed under JT Development, having M.L. Phuthanate as the CEO and M.L. Kanthika as HR director.
 JT Property Group Pub Co., Ltd. is a real estate business established by M.R. Taratorn, having M.L. Asira as CEO and M.L. Anistha as CFO.
 Chao is the rank that refers to the people who is the descendant of the royal family, the meaning is vary to the country it used
 In Thailand, the royal language doesn't use only with Mom Rajawongse (M.R.) and Mom Luang (M.L.) rank
 The rank Mom Rajawongse (M.R.) is casually called Khun Chai for male and Khun Ying for female
 The rank Mom Luang (M.L.) is the bottom Thai royal rank, casually called Khun

Notes

References 

Thai television soap operas
2020s Thai television series debuts
2020s Thai television series endings
Channel 3 (Thailand) original programming